Georges Aminel (1922–2007) was a French stage, film and television actor. His father was from Martinique.

Selected filmography
 Dangerous Turning (1954)
 Love in Jamaica (1957)
 Illegal Cargo (1958)
 Action Man (1967)
 The Butterfly Affair (1970)
 The Lonely Killers (1972)
 Tarzoon: Shame of the Jungle (1975)
 Star Wars (film) (1977)
 Parisian Life (1977)
 The Missing Link (1980)

References

Bibliography
 Melissa E. Biggs. French films, 1945-1993: a critical filmography of the 400 most important releases. McFarland & Company, 1996.

External links

1922 births
2007 deaths
French male film actors
French male stage actors
People from Clichy, Hauts-de-Seine